Sebastiano Bianchetti (born 20 January 1996) is an Italian male shot putter.

Biography
He won two bronze medal at 2017 European Athletics U23 Championships and at 2015 European Athletics Junior Championships.

Achievements

National titles
He won four national championships.
 Italian Athletics Championships
Shot put: 2016, 2017, 2018
 Italian Athletics Indoor Championships
Shot put: 2017

See also
 Italian all-time lists - Shot put

References

External links
 

1996 births
Living people
Italian male shot putters
Athletics competitors of Fiamme Oro